Mosbacher is a surname. Notable people with the surname include:

 Dee Mosbacher (born 1949), American filmmaker and lesbian feminist, daughter of Robert
 Emil Mosbacher (1922–1997), yachtsman
 Eric Mosbacher (1903–1998), journalist 
 Georgette Mosbacher (born 1947), American businesswoman and Republican fundraiser; former wife of Robert
 Peter Mosbacher (1912–1977), actor
 Robert Mosbacher (1927–2010), American businessman, United States Secretary of Commerce, yachtsman
 Robert Mosbacher Jr. (born 1951), American businessman and Republican politician; former head of the Overseas Private Investment Corporation; son of Robert